Hasanpur, Nangla is a village in the East Delhi district of Delhi, India.

Hasanpur is located in prime area of East Delhi – near Patparganj and Mayur Vihar. Landmarks of Village Hasanpur include Max Balaji Hospital, Patparganj/ Hasanpur Depot/ Patparganj Industrial Area, National Victor Public School.
   
The originally inhabitants of Hasanpur are  Brahmans of Jamdagni clan; however, subsequent to urbanisation, the population of Village now also includes persons hailing from different parts of country belonging to different castes and creeds.

The village is not large in size and the current population of the Village is approximately 1100. The village is largely urbanised and the villagers' major source of income is from the rentals. The Village boasts of some rich landlords and the land holding of the Villagers, prior to acquisition, extended up to Mandawali Village. The entire Hasanpur Depot and Patparganj Industrial Area have come up on the land forming part of revenue estate of Village Hasanpur. Village was recently in news when DMRC (Delhi Metro Rail Corporation) decided to pay a sum of Rs.5.91 crores for easement rights of plots measuring about 700 m². Owing to its location and easy connectivity, a large number of offices of advocates practising at Supreme Court have come up in the area.

Famous personalities: Late Pt. Shamshera Singh Jamdagni , Pt. Chatar Singh Jamdagni , Mr. Manohar Naagar (Advocate- Supreme Court) of Hasanpur Village was elected as DUSU Vice-President and is a prominent NSUI/Congress Leader;  Now due to delhi's urbanisation, village has adopted the PWD constituency so there is no system of headmen ( Pradhan/Sarpanch ) in this village like the other laal dora villages of delhi and present councillor of the area is Mrs. Aparna Goel (BJP) and MLA of the constituency is Pt. Omparkash Sharma (BJP)↵The pincode of Hasanpur is 110092.
It comes under Patparganj lok sabha constituency.

References

Villages in East Delhi district